Sabreen; is a pioneer Palestinian Arabic musical group. Based in Jerusalem, Sabreen was founded in 1980 by Said Murad. Their vision focused on the development of the Palestinian modern song, reflecting the humanitarian and cultural reality in general, and the suffering endured from the political situation in particular. Sabreen's members have changed over the years, the most notable members were Said Murad, Kamilya Jubran, Odeh Tourjman, Issa Freij, Yacoub Abu Arafeh, Issam Murad, Samer Mussallem, and Wissam Murad. Said Murad is the composer and arranger of the music, and Kamilya Jubran was the lead vocalist on four albums out of the five studio albums released.

In 1987 Sabreen Association for Artistic Development was established as a non-profit, community-based organization specializing in the promotion of music in Palestine and combining it with different artistic expressions and forms.

Etymology
The group's name is the Arabic adjective meaning "the patient ones", "people who are patient", or "those awaiting".

Music
During the 1970s there were two types of bands: westernized bands that played western instruments and eastern bands that played eastern instruments. Sabreen presented a mix that merged the gaps between the two styles blending elements of traditional Arab and Eastern music with international influences from Indian music to African music to American jazz and blues. Sabreen helped introduce a trend of committed music, or "Multazimeh", which was gaining popularity in Egypt with Sheikh Imam and Ahmed Fouad Negm, and in Lebanon with Marcel Khalife and Ziad Rahbani. The music's soundscape incorporated Eastern instruments like the oud, kawal, buzuq, and qanun, while also incorporating Western instruments such as the guitar, violin, cello, and double bass.

The lyrics of Sabreen's songs are mostly by renowned poets such as Mahmoud Darwish, Samih al-Qasim, Hussein Barghouti, and Fadwa Touqan.

The group has released four albums with the lead singer Kamilya Jubran, and another one after she left the group. Each album was released at an important political juncture. The first one "Dukhan al-Barakin" (Smoke of Volcanoes) was released in the early 1980s coinciding with the Israeli invasion of Lebanon and the Sabra and Shatila massacres. The songs included poems by Palestinian poets including Mahmoud Darwish and Samih al-Qasim, and style was rooted in folklore. Their second album "Mawt al-Nabi" (Death of the Prophet) was made during a particularly introspective period before the first Intifada, focusing on everyday life under Israeli occupation. This album was an act of resistance with a clear-cut message. "Jayy al-Hamam" (Here Come the Doves), was released next in 1994, was upbeat, in keeping with the hope fostered by the now-defunct Oslo peace process. The fourth CD, "Ala Fein" (Where to?) released in 2000, uses poems by Talal Haydar, Sayyed Hegab and the Fadwa Tuqan (Palestine), conveying a sense of deep nostalgia and despair.

In 2002 Kamilya Jubran left the band and moved to France to pursue a solo career. Sabreen released another album titled Maz'ooj which saw a departure from the band's sound. The electro-infused album included lyrics by Said Murad and vocals by Palestinian actor Mohammad Bakri.

Main Members

 Said Murad: Composer & Arranger, Oud, Percussion, Kawal, Rababa, Lyrics (Maz’ouj)
 Kamilya Jubran: Vocals, Qanoon, Buzuq, Percussions
 Odeh Tourjam: Vocals, Contrabass, 
 Issa Freij: Guitar, Contrabass
 Jamal Mughrabi: Buzuq
 Yacoub Abu Arafeh: Percussion
 Issam Murad: Drums, Sound Engineer
 Samer Musalem: Backing Vocals
 Wissam Murad: Vocals, Oud, Percussion, Oud, Keyboard

Other Members 

 Nell Catchpole: Violin
 Chris Smith: Acoustic Guitar, Saxophone
 Sarah Murcia: Contrebass
 Matt Sharp: Cello
 Valerie Pearson: Violin
 Samer Khoury: Tambourine
 Sherly Smart: Cello

Discography 

 "Smoke of the Volcanoes" - 1984
 "Death of the Prophet" - 1987
 "Here Come The Doves" - 1994
 "Ala Fein?" (Where To?) - 2000
 "Maz'ooj" - 2002

Sabreen Association for Artistic Development

In 1987 Sabreen was registered as a community-based NGO with the goal of developing music in Palestine. Sabreen plays the role of a music resource organization organizing summer camps, workshops, festivals, and training many Palestinian musicians. The Sabreen offices and recording studio are based in Sheikh Jarrah, East Jerusalem. It has served as an important cultural organization and taken on many important projects. Under an agreement with the Palestinian Ministry of Education, Sabreen has introduced a music curriculum into Palestinian schools. Countless artists have passed through Sabreen Studios in Jerusalem whether through productions, workshops, and programs including Tamer Nafar, Hatari, Coldplay, Bashar Murad, Apo and The Apostles, Shadia Mansour, Le Trio Joubran, Reem Talhami, and more.  In 2007 Sabreen launched the "Palestinian Eurovision" in partnership with The Palestinian Broadcasting Corporation and Superflex. This initiative aimed to enter Palestine into the Eurovision Song Contest.

References

External links
Official Youtube Page
Sabreen - The Official Facebook Page

Oud players
Palestinian musicians
Palestinian singers